William Wayne Watters (born June 29, 1943) is a Canadian sports media personality and former Assistant General Manager of the Toronto Maple Leafs.

College career
Watters was a fullback and linebacker with the Toronto Varsity Blues football team from 1961 through 1964. He was a team co-captain and league All-Star at linebacker in both 1963 and 1964. In his final season (1964), he received the Johnny Copp Trophy as the team's Most Valuable Player. Watters also was a member of the Wrestling Blues for three seasons (1961–62, 62–63, 63–64) and practiced regularly with the Varsity Blues men's ice hockey team, although he saw limited action in league play. He earned a total of three First Colours and five Second Colours, and served on the UTAA Men's Athletic Directorate in 1963–64.

Professional sports career
Watters was selected second overall by the Toronto Argonauts in the 1964 CFL draft but chose not to play professional football after he was cut due to a knee injury. In the 2000s, his son, Brad Watters, became the Argonaut's Team President. Following graduation, he embarked on a career as a teacher then turned to professional sports as a broadcaster, player agent, and Assistant General Manager of Toronto Maple Leafs from 1991 to 2003.

Sportscasting career
Watters formerly co-hosted Hockey Central on Rogers Sportsnet, The Bill Watters Show on AM 640 Toronto Radio and has been a regular contributor on Q107's John Derringer morning show. Watters was also a former co-host of Prime Time Sports back when it debuted in 1989. On January 14, 2011 his contract expired and left Rogers Sportsnet. The Bill Watters show on AM 640 Toronto Radio has been replaced by the drive-time show by Arlene Bynon as of July 18, 2011 due to Bill's contract expiring and a reprogram of the station.

Watters is now a co-host on the bi-weekly live internet broadcast of "Next Sport Star" (NSS) along with entrepreneur and filmmaker Frank D'Angelo, hockey great Phil Esposito and sportscaster John Gallagher.

References

1943 births
Living people
Canadian football linebackers
Canadian radio sportscasters
Canadian television sportscasters
Ice hockey people from Ontario
National Hockey League broadcasters
National Hockey League executives
People from Orillia
Players of Canadian football from Ontario
Toronto Maple Leafs announcers
Toronto Maple Leafs executives
Toronto Varsity Blues football players
Toronto Varsity Blues ice hockey players